Modesta is a 1956 short film, set in Puerto Rico, in which a peasant woman rebels against her husband's authoritarianism. She and the other women of her community organize the Liberated Women League to fight for their rights. It stars Antonia Hidalgo and Juan Ortiz Jiménez.

The movie was adapted by Benjamin Doniger, Luis A. Maisonet and René Marqués from a story by Domingo Silas Ortiz. It was directed by Doniger. In 1998, Modesta was selected for preservation in the United States National Film Registry by the Library of Congress as being "culturally, historically, or aesthetically significant".

External links

1956 films
United States National Film Registry films
Labor rights
Labor in Puerto Rico
American black-and-white films